Willard August Anderson (May 5, 1897 – April 24, 1982) was an American football player.  A native of Muskegon, Michigan, he played college football at Syracuse and professional football as a fullback for the Rochester Jeffersons in the National Football League (NFL). He appeared in four NFL games, three as a starter, during the 1923 and 1924 seasons.

References

1897 births
1982 deaths
Rochester Jeffersons players
People from Muskegon, Michigan
Players of American football from Michigan
Syracuse Orange football players